Jhane Barnes is an American designer of clothing, textiles, eyeglasses, carpets and furniture, and the owner of the Jhane Barnes fashion design company. Barnes is known for incorporating complex, mathematical patterns into her clothing designs. She uses computer software to design textile patterns, which then translates the patterns into jacquard loom instructions, which are sent to mills to be woven into fabric.

Design career
Barnes studied at the Fashion Institute of Technology. She launched her fashion company in 1976 with a $5,000 loan from her Fashion Institute of Technology Biology professor.  The company's first design was a pair of pants which had no back pockets. This design became popular with celebrities and helped to launch her career.

In 1978, she bought her first loom, and quickly became known for her innovative textiles. A big part of what makes her work notable is her work with several mathematicians, including Bernt Wahl, Bill Jones and Dana Cartwright in creating some of her designs. She has been featured in Wired. She received the 1980 and 1981 Coty Menswear Award. She designed the tenth anniversary Orlando Magic uniforms.  Her designs are sold at many upscale stores, including Saks Fifth Avenue and Nordstrom. Celebrities who have worn Barnes's clothing include Cher, Bette Midler, Elton John, Robin Williams, Daryl Hall and John Oates, and Richard Dreyfuss.

In addition to her success in the world of fashion, Barnes has been a prolific product, textile, carpet and furniture designer. Her awards include 4 Good Design Awards from the Chicago Athenaeum Museum of Architecture for her textile, furniture and carpet designs; a three-time winner for the Jhane Barnes Textile collection: “Best of NEOCON” in 1998, 1999 and 2000.  Her work includes partnerships with Bernhardt Design, Lumicor, Kenmark Optical and Tandus Flooring.

Awards and nominations
 1980: Coty American Fashion Critics' Award -Coty Award:
 1981: First ever Menswear Designer of the Year  - CFDA
 1981: Cutty Sark, Outstanding Designer of the Year, Menswear
 1982: Cutty Sark, Outstanding Designer of the Year, Menswear
 1983: IBD Award, Gold for first Knoll textile collection
 1984: Coty American Fashion Critics' Award -Coty Award
 1986: ASID American Society of Interior Designers Award for Knoll textile collection
 1990: Woolmark Award for Menswear
 1995: Best of Neocon Silver Award for Seating: Sofas & Chairs, Bernhardt (Tatami Lounge Collection)
 2004: Calibre Lifetime Achievement Award

See also
 List of fashion designers

References

External links
 
 Barnes at Bernhadt Design website 
 Barnes at Encyclopedia.com

1954 births
Living people
American fashion businesspeople
American fashion designers
American women fashion designers
Fashion Institute of Technology alumni
People from Baltimore County, Maryland
20th-century American businesswomen
20th-century American businesspeople
21st-century American businesswomen
21st-century American businesspeople
Businesspeople from Maryland